Vanka the Steward is a 1909 Russian short drama film directed by Vasili Goncharov.

Plot 
The film is based on Russian folk song «Vanka the Steward».

Cast 

 Vasili Stepanov as Prince
 Lyubov Varyagina as Princess
 Andrey Gromov as Vanka
 Aleksandra Goncharova as Girl

References

External links 
 
 «Vanka the Steward» on kinopoisk.ru
 «Vanka the Steward» on kino-teatr.ru
 «Vanka the Steward» on Encyclopedia of Russian Cinema

1909 films
1900s Russian-language films
Russian silent short films
Russian black-and-white films
Films directed by Vasily Goncharov
Films of the Russian Empire
Russian drama films
1909 drama films
1909 short films
Silent drama films